Milton Esterow (born July 28, 1928) is an American art journalist.

Early work as a journalist 
Growing up in Brooklyn, he attended Brooklyn College and started writing for the New York Times while still a student. Milton worked there for decades as a prolific writer, devoted mainly to the drama department and film reviews. In the early 1960s, he discovered a niche in the area of cultural news, bringing an investigative style to a part of newspaper journalism that had previously been devoted to reviews of exhibits and biographical profiles of important personalities. His 1966 book The Art Stealers: A History of Certain Fabulous Art Thefts was an important milestone in his professional development. In a review, Stuart Fleming called it "absorbing" and "excellently researched".

ARTnews 
Milton and Judith Esterow owned America's oldest continually published art magazine ARTnews from 1972 to 2014. While the monthly was devoted to the American art scene in general, Milton Esterow invented a new style of investigative journalism in the art world and doubled the magazine's circulation. He is considered to be an innovator in this field, especially as regards art theft and the restitution of works taken illegally during World War II.

Milton Esterow worked as a writer, publisher, and editor-in-chief of the periodical for 42 years; his life's work was to make the periodical the world’s largest circulated arts magazine. He aimed to "humanize" the art world and offer writing that was accessible to a wider audience, especially in an era of American history that saw art becoming more accessible to a larger audience. Scholarly articles with footnotes, common in the magazine before 1972, ceased to appear, while Esterow gave more coverage to personalities and the developments of the art market. He also published full-length art books "that tell the reader in language he or she can understand what the artist is all about and get away from the gobbledegook."

Esterow hobnobbed with famous figures in the art world, including Henry Moore, Robert Rauschenberg, and Ansel Adams. Famous ARTnews covers have featured Jasper Johns and Pablo Picasso.

The annual feature listing the "world's top 200 art collectors" was accepted by many in the art world as a prestigious ranking. Others criticized the magazine's method of polling in order to determine "Ten Best Living Artists".

Awards 

 George Polk Award for cultural reporting, awarded twice
 National Magazine Award
EMIPS Art Award, given by the association of New York County Lawyers, 2008
College Art Association Award

Book Collection 
Esterow donated his collection of art books to Brooklyn College Library.

References 

1928 births
Brooklyn College alumni
The New York Times people
American magazine publishers (people)
George Polk Award recipients
American investigative journalists
American theater critics
American film critics
American art collectors
Nazi-looted art
Living people